A World of Difference  is a 1990 science fiction novel by American writer Harry Turtledove.

The book begins with a space voyage that departed Earth in an alternate 1989. In the universe of the book, the fourth planet from the Sun, in the orbit occupied by Mars in our reality, is named Minerva, which is similar in size and makeup to Earth.

Plot summary
When the Viking 1 space probe lands on Minerva in 1976 it takes a picture of a native Minervan wielding a primitive tool, thus proving the existence of intelligent life on other worlds.

The main action of the story involves separate American and Soviet missions, who both pay lip service to non-interference with Minervan society, but in the course of their research, the teams' respective political ideologies inevitably come to the fore. This leads the teams and their commanders back home to use the Minervans in a transparent analogy to Third World/Cold War proxy conflicts on Earth. One of the Americans saves the life of a female Minervan after she gives birth. Eventually Minervans get their hands on high tech items like steel hatchets, rubber rafts, and finally AK-74s, which severely disrupt their way of life.

The planet Minerva
Minerva has an atmosphere similar to Earth's and breathable by humans, and liquid water exists in significant quantities on the surface. The planet's mean atmospheric temperature is lower than Earth's due to the greater distance from the sun, although the greenhouse effect of its thicker atmosphere means that it is not as cold as our universe's Mars. The ancient astronomers of the novel name the bright blue/gray planet Minerva after the goddess of wisdom.

Minervan biology and society
Minervan animals (including the sentient Minervans) are hexameristically radially symmetrical. This means that they have six eyes spaced equally all around, see in all directions and have no "back" where somebody could sneak on them unnoticed. The different way that Minervans perceive their environment, and its major influence on their culture and way of life, is a significant plot element – especially important in the battle scenes towards the end.

Females (referred to as "mates" by the Minervans) give birth to litters that consist of one male and five females, and the "mates" always die after reproducing because of torrential bleeding from the places where the six fetuses were attached; this gives a population multiplication of 5 per generation if all females live to adolescence and reproduce. Females reach puberty while still hardly out of childhood, and typically experience sex only once in the lifetime – leading to pregnancy and death at birth-giving.

Thus, in Minervan society male dominance seems truly determined by a biological imperative – though it takes different forms in various Minervan societies: in some females are considered expendable and traded as property, in other they are cherished and their tragic fate mourned – but still their dependant status is taken for granted.

The American women arriving on Minerva and discovering this situation consider it intolerable; a major plot element is their efforts, using the resources of Earth medical science, to find a way of saving the Minervan females and let them survive birth-giving. At the end, they do manage to save a particularly sympathetic Minervan female – potentially opening the way for a complete upheaval in Minervan society.

Technically, the Minervans can be said to be living in a neolithic society, since they use stone tools. However, though using no metals, their society is actually feudal and comparable to late Middle Ages Europe, and actually one of the Minervan societies depicted – the one contacted by the Soviets – shows the beginnings of mercantile capitalism (which is directly related to its being the more aggressive and predatory one).

It is this nascent capitalist society which the Soviets decide to support in its effort to invade and conquer its feudal rival. This raises some eyebrows among the cosmonauts; however, as the resident ideologue explains to his bemused comrades, it is quite sound Marxist doctrine, based on Marx's theory of history: Capitalism is more progressive than Feudalism; therefore, helping it win will help prepare Minervan society to get to Socialism some centuries hence.

Earth
In addition to the existence of Minerva the book alludes to a variety of subtle differences between its history and ours. The fact that the fourth planet was blue rather than red as in our universe, and named for a different deity of the Classical pantheon, did not significantly change life on Earth. Galileo is mentioned as having seen Minerva in his telescope and made the first drawing of its surface; this did not, however, make his general career significantly different from in our timeline.

However, fundamental differences seem to have started to develop since the mid-1970s. Following the discovery of intelligent life on Minerva, both superpowers engaged energetically on efforts to launch a crewed spacecraft there. This evidently had an effect of exacerbating tensions on Earth, with American and Soviet planes engaging three times in direct aerial combat over Beirut – presumably drawn, after the Israeli Invasion of Lebanon in 1982, into a far deeper involvement than in our history.

An escalation into all-out nuclear war was avoided only with difficulty, and though things have calmed down a bit by 1989 when the plot takes place, the Cold War is still very much on, and the Soviet Union is still very much a police state keeping its citizens (even cosmonauts millions of miles from home) on a short leash. Mikhail Gorbachev had led for only nine months, and barely got started on Glasnost, before dying from a stroke (though there are rumors of a secret assassination, which Soviet characters prudently avoid discussing too loudly).

Allusions to other works
The Georgian member of the Soviet crew, who has some frictions with his Russian crewmates due to cultural differences, is named "Shota Rustaveli" after the 12th century poet Shota Rustaveli.

Publication history
A World of Difference has been published in hardcover in Great Britain by Hodder & Stoughton.

Translations
 Italian:  (Mission to Minerva) (transl. by Carlo Borriello) Fanucci Editore, 2000.
 Russian:  (A Space Battle) (transl. by G.A. Il'insky) Rusich, 1997, .

See also

 Barsoom
 The Sky People
 In the Courts of the Crimson Kings
 Old Mars
 Hard to Be a God
 Kepler 186f, an exoplanet discovered in 2014 with a size and temperature very similar to Minerva

References

1990 American novels
Novels set during the Cold War
Novels set on fictional planets
Novels set on Mars
Novels by Harry Turtledove
1990 science fiction novels
Planetary romances
American alternate history novels
American science fiction novels
Del Rey books
Fiction set in 1989